The Women's 5 km competition of the Open water swimming events at the 2011 World Aquatics Championships was held on July 22.

Medalists

Results
The final was held on July 22.

References

External links
2011 World Aquatics Championships: Women's 5 km start list, from OmegaTiming.com; retrieved 2011-07-21.

Women's 05 km
World Aquatics Championships
2011 in women's swimming